The World Inline Cup is the leading competition in inline speed skating.

History
In 1999 first attempts in order to establish a racing series with standardized evaluation system and rules were made. The then called European Inline Cup was managed by CERS (Confédération Européenne de Roller Skating). Back then the company Playlife was its main sponsor. In 2000 the Grand Prix, including the eight biggest competitions in Europe, occurred for the first time. Since 2001 competitions were held all over the world. The evaluation categories Grand Prix, Class 1 and Class 2 were born.

In 2003 the IGUANA Think Thank AG, which already was supporting the Swiss Inline Cup, took over the organization of the Cup, naming it World-Inline-Cup. 3 years later IGUANA Schweiz AG superseded the IGUANA Think Thank AG until finally IGUANA Deutschland GmbH, resident in Berlin, undertook the organization in 2014. Furthermore, they have been maintaining the German Inline Cup since 2008.

Evaluation mode
Since 2000 there were various changes regarding the evaluation system. In the beginning all races were equivalent Grand-Prix-races. Departs 2001 two additional races, depending on how reputable the competition was, were launched: Class 1 and Class 2.

From 2003 onwards, the class Grand Prix was replaced by Top Class. Until 2004 the three classes existed equally. In the following year there was no Class 2-race taking place for the first time.

Since 2010 only the classes Top Class and Class 1 persisted. In 2017 an additional Junior Ranking was launched.

Point Scale (Stand 2019)
The awarding of score is inflexible. There are two different types of evaluation of the races in which the winner can either score 90 or up until 150 points. The points of Top-Class-races outside of Europe are multiplied by 1.2, whereas the points of the final race of the season are multiplied by 1.4.

Overall Champions

Woman

Men

Overall Champions by countries

Statistics

More victories 

 Bold active skaters.

External links
 :de:World-Inline-Cup
 http://www.world-inline-cup.com/home/ (Website)
 https://www.facebook.com/worldinlinecup/ (Facebook)

Inline speed skating competitions
Inline